Eilema flavicosta is a moth of the subfamily Arctiinae first described by Frederic Moore in 1878. It is found in the Indian state of Assam and Borneo.

References

flavicosta